Knightsbridge is a hamlet neighbouring Elmstone-Hardwicke and Uckington, close to Junction 10 of the M5 motorway, near Cheltenham in Gloucestershire, England.
In addition to residential housing, Knightsbridge is home to a small business park.

References

Hamlets in Gloucestershire
Borough of Tewkesbury